There are five types of elections in Slovakia: municipal elections, regional elections, parliamentary elections, presidential elections and elections to the European Parliament. All four types of elections are normally held after fixed periods, although early elections can occur in certain situations. Elections are conventionally scheduled for a Saturday - the polls normally open at 7:00 in the morning and close at 22:00 in the evening.
Citizens aged 18 years or older are eligible to vote. Those serving prison sentences for particularly serious crimes, as well as those deprived of legal capacity (either wholly or in part), including persons with mental disabilities, are denied the right to vote.
Voter registration is passive and decentralized with the voter register maintained by municipalities based on the permanent residence register. Voter lists are updated continuously based on municipal records and input provided by state institutions or other municipalities. Voters may verify their data in voter lists, and, if necessary, request correction until the day before election day. On election day, a voter can be added to a voter list upon presenting an identity card with proof of residency. Some 4.4 million voters are registered and valid to vote in the elections. Voters are only able to vote from abroad during the Parliamentary Elections in Slovakia.

Overall information on the electoral system and elections in Slovakia

Municipal elections 
2,904 municipalities make up Slovakia each with a mayor and municipal councilors (20,646).  Citizens need to reach the age of 18 at the day of elections and have a permanent residency in their municipalities in order to be able to vote in the municipal elections. After receiving the ballot paper from the electoral commission, the voter is free to select any desired number of candidates - the maximum being the number of the seats in the electoral district (or in the Town council in case of a village). As well voters can vote for a mayor. Elections are held every four years.

The next election will be held on 29 October 2022.

Regional elections

Slovakia comprises eight self-governing regions. Citizens need to reach the age of 18 at the day of elections and have a permanent residency in their municipalities in order to be able to vote in the regional elections. After receiving the ballot paper from the electoral commission, the voter is free to select any desired number of candidates - the maximum being the number of all the candidates on the ballot paper. In 2017, deputies of the Slovak National Council voted to extend the term of governors from 4 years to 5 years (for the 2017 election only), and change from a 2-round election to only 1 round. After the 2022 regional elections, they will be held every four years together with municipal elections.

The next election will be held on 29 October 2022.

Parliamentary elections

Slovakia is a parliamentary republic. Legislative powers are vested in the National Assembly of the Slovak Republic (Slovak: Národná rada Slovenskej republiky, NRSR). The NRSR is of a unicameral body and consists of 150 members of the parliament directly elected by universal adult suffrage for a four-year term office. The prime minister, who serves as the head of government, is appointed by the president, but is accountable solely to the NRSR. The seats at National Assembly are elected by a proportional representation (PR) in a single, nationwide electoral constituency. Slovakia has a multi-party system, with numerous parties in which no one party often has a chance of gaining power alone, and parties must work with each other to form coalition governments. Before the elections, political parties (or coalitions of two or more parties) submit the lists of candidates. Voters may indicate preferences for up to four candidates in one list. The seats at National Council are distributed by Hagenbach-Bischoff method on a nationwide basis - however a threshold of 5% of the votes needs to be met in order for a party to participate in the distribution of National Council seats, whereas coalitions of two to three parties and four or more parties are required to obtain at least seven and ten percent of the vote, respectively.

Presidential elections

Since Slovakia operates under a parliamentary system of government, the president largely possesses only with ceremonial functions, but is also equipped with the opportunity to veto legislation (although the veto can be easily overturned by the simple majority in the parliament). By law, the presidential election should be called no later than 55 days prior to election day. The president serves as a head of state and is directly elected by universal suffrage in a two-stage election. If no candidate obtains an absolute majority of all valid votes cast in the first round, then the top two candidates qualify for a runoff election, in which the candidate with the largest number of votes is elected to office for a term of five years. In order to secure a place on the ballot, presidential candidates must be nominated by fifteen members of the National Council, or by a petition signed by 15,000 citizens.

Originally, the National Council chose the president, but a 1999 amendment to the constitution established the popular election of the president by runoff voting. Popular voting for presidential elections was adopted following a prolonged impasse in 1998, in which the National Council repeatedly tried to elect a new president, but no candidate attained the three-fifths majority required by the constitution.

Elections to the European parliament

Slovakia is a member of the European Union since 1 May 2004 and therefore only witnessed three elections to the European Parliament since. Slovakia gets to elect thirteen members of the European Parliament, using a proportional representation system. During its 15-year membership in the European Union, Slovakia has consistently scored the lowest among the member countries in the turnout rates during European elections. In 2014, when the latest European elections took place, the turnout in Slovakia was only at 13% of registered voters.

Latest elections

2019 presidential election

2020 parliamentary election

Composition of the National Council since 1990

2019 European Parliament election

Composition of Slovak MEPs since 2004

See also
 Electoral calendar
 Electoral system

References

External links
All Slovak elections since 1992 - Statistical Office of Slovakia
Slovak Election Data Project
Adam Carr's Election Archive
Parties and Elections in Europe
 NSD: European Election Database - Slovakia publishes regional level election data; allows for comparisons of election results, 1990-2010
Slovakia Election Data, European Journal of Political Research-Political Data Yearbook: Interactive